Ravar County (also romanized as Rāvar) is in Kerman province, Iran. The capital of the county is the city of Ravar. At the 2006 census, the county's population was 38,539 in 10,236 households. The following census in 2011 counted 40,295 people in 11,951 households. At the 2016 census the county's population was 43,198, in 13,281 households.

Ravar is the very northernmost county of Kerman province.  It is on the border of the large desert area of South Khorasan province, called the Loot Desert (Dasht-e Lut, or "Emptiness Plain").

Carpet-weaving is one of the main industries of the county, and the carpets produced there are renowned internationally. This art is a very old tradition in Ravar.

Administrative divisions

The population history of Ravar County's administrative divisions over three consecutive censuses is shown in the following table. The latest census shows two districts, three rural districts, and two cities.

References

 

Counties of Kerman Province